Please Speak Continuously and Describe Your Experiences as They Come to You is a 2019 Canadian science fiction thriller short film directed by Brandon Cronenberg. The film stars Deragh Campbell as Emily, an institutionalized woman who is describing her dreams to psychiatrist Dr. Fino (Neil Bennett).

The film premiered at the 2019 Cannes Film Festival, and had its North American premiere at the 2019 Toronto International Film Festival. In December 2019, the film was named to TIFF's annual year-end Canada's Top Ten list for short films.

References

External links
 

2019 films
2010s science fiction thriller films
Canadian science fiction thriller films
Canadian science fiction short films
Films directed by Brandon Cronenberg
2010s English-language films
2010s Canadian films
English-language Canadian films